Île Kuchistiniwamiskahikan is an island located in Baie-d'Hudson, Quebec. The name is Cree for "The island where boats entering the bay".

It is also known for having the longest official one-word placename in Quebec.

References

Landforms of Nord-du-Québec
Kuchistiniwamiskahikan